, also known as , is a fictional character from Konami's Metal Gear video game series. Created by Hideo Kojima and designed by Yoji Shinkawa, he is most notably the protagonist in the 2015 game Metal Gear Solid V: The Phantom Pain. He is performed via voice acting and performance capture by Akio Ōtsuka in the Japanese version and by Kiefer Sutherland in the English version.

Within the series, Venom Snake is the leader of a mercenary unit, Diamond Dogs, who returns to the battlefield after waking up from a nine-year coma in an incident that also resulted in the loss of his left arm and a piece of shrapnel embedded into the right side of his forehead. While initially introduced in-game as long-standing Metal Gear character Big Boss, it is revealed he is actually a former physician and combat medic who underwent facial reconstruction and subliminal brainwashing to serve as Big Boss' body double; via retcon, Venom Snake is also revealed to be the man killed by Solid Snake at the end of the original 1987 game.

Venom Snake and his role as a replacement for Big Boss in The Phantom Pain received mixed opinions from critics, with some finding the decision fitting in the context of the series, while others thought it negated the emotional crux of the game's story or failed to provide closure. Sutherland's performance garnered praise from critics, although some were bemused by his relative lack of dialogue.

Appearances

Metal Gear Solid V 

His original identity (whose face is partially obscured when he's on-screen) was employed by Big Boss' Militaires Sans Frontières private forces. He accompanies Big Boss in the helicopter extraction of Ricardo "Chico" Valenciano Libre and Paz Ortega Andrade from a U.S. Naval prison facility in Cuba in 1975. He successfully removes a time bomb implanted inside Paz's abdomen, but fails to notice a second bomb within Paz which goes off, causing their helicopter to crash in the process. The medic shields Big Boss from the blast and the two men survive the crash, but the medic ends up losing his left arm while fragments of bones and teeth are buried within his body, including a large piece of shrapnel lodged within his cerebral cortex. Both Big Boss and the medic fall into a coma for the next nine years. During his coma, the medic is transferred to a hospital in Cyprus, where he is subjected to Zero's process of subconscious brainwashing and facial reconstruction in order to be Big Boss' mental doppelganger (now dubbed "Snake") to draw attention away from his mental template. After awakening, Snake escapes the hospital following an attack by XOF strike force and is extracted by Revolver Ocelot. He takes command of the Diamond Dogs mercenary unit along with a new Mother Base constructed near Seychelles in 1984. Snake then engages in a series of missions in Afghanistan and Central Africa as he and Kazuhira Miller seek revenge for lost comrades and pursues the Cipher organization. With Miller and Ocelot as advisers, he recruits several individuals into his army, including companions such as the sniper Quiet and the canine D-Dog. Snake ultimately comes face to face with XOF's leader Skull Face, as well as the traitorous Huey Emmerich and the leader of a child mercenary group, Eli. During an unspecified time period, he is shown receiving Big Boss' cassette tape, with one side labelled "Operation Intrude N313" which he plays on a Sony BitCorder device connected to a HiTBiT MSX2 computer; the timeline establishes that he would die fighting against Solid Snake in Outer Heaven.

After Metal Gear Solid V 

The character of Big Boss debuted in the original Metal Gear game, initially serving as Solid Snake's commanding officer of FOXHOUND and main radio contact, while also serving as the leader of Outer Heaven's forces. Despite an apparent defeat, the game ends with a message from Big Boss vowing revenge following the credits. Metal Gear 2: Solid Snake had an in-game rumor about Big Boss rebuilt with cybernetic parts after being mortally wounded during the previous game's final encounter; this explanation was used for Big Boss' survival in the Metal Gear Solid 4 Database, although it has since been retconned with the release of The Phantom Pain.

Creation and design

Physical appearance 

Venom Snake is distinguished from the original Big Boss by his bionic left arm, the numerous facial scars, and the shrapnel "horn" protruding from the right side of his forehead. His eye-patch also differs from the one usually worn by Big Boss, as it has three straps instead of just two. The decision to have Snake lose his left arm was made early during the development of Metal Gear Solid V, although originally he was supposed to wear a regular prosthetic rather than a bionic arm.

The game features a hidden "karma" system which causes Snake's appearance to change based on the player's behavior. Negative actions such as killing people and animals or developing nuclear weapons earn Demon Points. Earning 20,000 Demon Points causes Snake's horn to grow, and reaching 50,000 makes it grow even longer and causes Snake to become permanently soaked in blood. This demonic appearance is accentuated by Snake's belt, which resembles a tail. Positive actions such as extracting animals and child soldiers, earning certain achievements, or visiting Mother Base's zoo will eventually reverse these changes, which are purely aesthetic.

Casting 

In Metal Gear Solid V, Venom Snake is portrayed by Canadian actor Kiefer Sutherland through voice-over and facial motion capture, briefly as the medic in Ground Zeroes and then as the player character throughout The Phantom Pain. Sutherland also plays Big Boss, but the official credits make no distinction between either character, with the role, simply billed as "Snake". The casting was announced by Konami on 6 June 2013, during the annual Konami Pre-E3 show. Kojima's reason for selecting Sutherland rather than David Hayter—who had voiced Big Boss previously—was to "have a more subdued performance expressed through subtle facial movements and tone of voice rather than words", and that he "needed someone who could genuinely convey both the facial and vocal qualities of a man in his late 40s". Hollywood producer and director Avi Arad suggested to Kojima that Sutherland could fulfill these requirements. Akio Ōtsuka was unaffected by this casting change and continued to voice the character in the Japanese version, dubbing over Sutherland's facial capture performance (a first for the series). On 4 March 2015, Kojima said that Snake would have less dialogue in The Phantom Pain than in previous installments, explaining that this would make Snake more an extension of the player and that he would act based on the player's actions "rather than doing things like making spontaneous comments or flirting with women."

Naming 
The character was initially introduced as "Punished Snake" in the E3 2013 trailer for Metal Gear Solid V, but this moniker would fall into disuse in favor of "Venom Snake", which is the name that was used in most of the promotional imagery and merchandising since E3 2014. Although the final game bills him as "Punished 'Venom' Snake" in the opening sequence of every mission, "Punished Snake" is never spoken by anyone, while "Venom Snake" is only spoken once in the actual game. In all other instances, the character is simply referred to as "Snake" or "Boss".

During the prologue sequence of the game, the player character is briefly given the name  by the medical staff protecting him in Cyprus, while Big Boss (whose face is covered in bandages) assumes the name Ishmael while helping the player thwart off the XOF forces pursuing them in the hospital. These are the names of the protagonist and the narrator in Moby-Dick. According to Kenji Yano (who wrote the novelization of The Phantom Pain under the pen name Hitori Nojima), these names were chosen to symbolize Big Boss handing down the role of protagonist to Venom Snake while Big Boss takes a supporting role in the story.

Reception 
The character of Venom Snake and his role in The Phantom Pain received a mixed reception. Asserting that Metal Gear has always been a primarily metafictional series, Dave Thier of Forbes praised the game's substitution of a player-created avatar for Big Boss. He felt that the twist acted as an ending to both the game and the series, rather than the plot, and wrote, "You've made it through every mission, you've backtracked, perfected, gotten your S ratings, and employed perfect stealth. That's it, you're Big Boss, you're Snake, You're 'you.' And you're done." Chris Carter of Destructoid said that Venom Snake made sense within the context of the series, as the games have "always dabbled in the concept of 'the legend' being stronger than the actual person", but was disappointed that the game's ending was not a remake of the original Metal Gear, featuring Sutherland as Venom Snake and Hayter as Solid Snake. PC Gamers Samuel Roberts called the revelation of Snake's identity "one perfect moment in a bad story", and thought that the twist worked on a literal level, making the medic a "tragic and unsettling" figure whose only meaningful relationship is with a woman (Quiet) who thinks he is Big Boss. Roberts complimented that in removing the character's identity of Big Boss, the epilogue left the player with "no backstory other than the one [they]'ve just created", reflecting the player's own unique experience and being "a perfect thematic match for [the] game".

Conversely, David Roberts from GamesRadar+ wrote that the reveal was a "strange" ending and "a bizarre bit of fridge logic that makes less and less sense the more I think about it". He further felt that the twist caused the story to become "hollow" and lacking in closure as a result of the "rehash[ing]" of missions during the game's second half and its "slapped in" ending. However, he thought a player-created avatar for Big Boss was "purely and distinctly Metal Gear" and a humorous way for Kojima to show his appreciation towards the series' long-term fans. Kotakus Jason Schreier similarly wrote that while the twist was "neat", it raised more questions under scrutiny, and felt that being misled into experiencing Big Boss' character arc when it was actually someone else cheapened the rationale behind key plot events. Schreier also disliked that The Phantom Pain failed to provide any explanation or context for both Venom Snake's and Big Boss' change of character and motivations for their villainous portrayals in Metal Gear and Metal Gear 2: Solid Snake, respectively.

Kiefer Sutherland received praise for his performance as Venom Snake, although some critics were bemused by the minimal dialogue spoken by the character throughout the game, calling it "strange", "suspicious", and "positively jarring".

Ryan Gilliam of Polygon included Venom Snake as one of the best video game characters of the 2010s, writing he was "one of the more complex characters in all of Metal Gear [...] The Big Boss character lost a lot with the switch from series regular David Hayter to celebrity voice talent Kiefer Sutherland. But Venom Snake makes the list because he isn't the hero. He's masquerading as the real Big Boss, unknowingly, and represents what a person can be if they're told exactly who they are."

References

Bibliography

Footnotes 
In-game

Sources

Amputee characters in video games
Characters designed by Yoji Shinkawa
Fictional assassins in video games
Fictional contract killers
Cyborg characters in video games
Fictional American people in video games
Fictional Angolan Civil War veterans
Fictional characters from California
Fictional characters with disfigurements
Fictional characters missing an eye
Fictional characters with post-traumatic stress disorder
Fictional revolutionaries
Fictional judoka
Fictional jujutsuka
Fictional karateka
Fictional commanders
Fictional military medical personnel
Fictional private military members
Fictional Soviet–Afghan War veterans
Fictional special forces personnel
Fictional physicians
Fictional impostors
Fictional anarchists
Fictional war criminals
Fiction about hypnosis
Konami antagonists
Konami protagonists
Male characters in video games
Fictional guerrillas
Fictional gunfighters in video games
Fictional marksmen and snipers
Fictional martial artists in video games
Fictional mercenaries in video games
Metal Gear characters
Fictional amputees
Fictional military personnel in video games
Fictional military spies
Fictional secret agents and spies in video games
Video game bosses
Video game characters introduced in 1987
Fictional warlords in video games